Kristine Leahy (born October 16, 1986) is an American television host and former sports reporter. She is most known as a former host on NBC's American Ninja Warrior. She is the former co-host and newswoman of Fox Sports 1's simulcast of The Herd with Colin Cowherd and was also a former anchor and reporter for KCBS-TV in Los Angeles.

In 2018, Leahy began hosting Fair Game with Kristine Leahy on Fox Sports 1. The show was cancelled in December 2019.

Early life 
Leahy was born in Chicago, where she became interested in sports. She graduated from Prairie Ridge High School in Crystal Lake, Illinois in 2005. She earned a Bachelor of Science in Journalism from Boston University.

Career
After college, Leahy got a job at the sports radio station WEEI in Boston. After a two-year stint at WEEI, she transitioned to a position as an official reporter of the Boston Celtics and Celtics.com. She turned that into a job at FOX Boston, where she covered all Boston area sports teams.

Leahy moved to Los Angeles in 2012 and covered a variety of different sports, most notably as a sideline reporter for Turner Sports' March Madness coverage. She worked for a variety of CBS affiliated sports outlets, including the local CBS Los Angeles news. Leahy then became the sideline reporter for American Ninja Warrior on NBC. In September 2015, she took a job to join former ESPN Radio host Colin Cowherd on his new show after his exodus to FOX. Cowherd cited a lack of female voices in sports talk radio as a reason for Leahy's addition to the show, as well as Leahy's history of developing useful sources as a sports journalist.

On May 17, 2017, Leahy, who in the past criticize LaVar Ball on his parenting skills and claim "his kids are afraid of him". Received a backlash from LaVar Ball on The Herd with Colin Cowherd. Ball never faced in Leahy's direction for the whole interview, apparently trying to talk only with Colin Cowherd on the other side of the studio. Ball argued with Leahy about whether or not Big Baller Brand should market to both men and women and when she asked him how many shoes he had already sold, he said, "Stay in your lane." During the segment, Leahy expressed that she believed Ball was disrespecting women, and he responded by calling her a "hater" for her previous criticism of his parenting. He also commented, "She scares me. I don't look over there because I'm scared of her. I'm thinking assault right now. Leave me alone." Later that day on The Herd, Leahy issued a response about her argument with Ball, saying, "So he was upset at me for what I said there, and that's completely fine. But you can't come at me and disrespect me and not look me in the eye and threaten me. That's just not OK." Ball, however, denied threatening her.

On May 19, 2017, Radio host Charlemagne the God, responded to the incident by claiming Leahy is using the same energy that got Emmett Till killed.

On November 20, 2017, Leahy criticized CNN for inviting Ball on the air to discuss his feud with US President Donald Trump.

Personal Life 
Married to Howie Liu.

References

External links
 http://www.kristineleahy.com/bio.html
 
 https://www.instagram.com/kristineleahy/

1986 births
American reporters and correspondents
American sports radio personalities
American television hosts
Boston University College of Communication alumni
Fox Sports 1 people
Living people
Radio personalities from Chicago
Radio personalities from Los Angeles
Women sports announcers
Women sports commentators
American women television presenters